1879-1959

Arthur Prince Spear is known for his imaginary paintings of nymphs, fauns and under-sea dwellers of an imaginary world of a very personal nature. Arthur Spear could be considered an "American Impressionist" yet he remains in a unique position...His art cannot be so easily classified and Spear belongs in a rare group of painters who have been in the minority of any generation in the history of American Art.

References

19th-century American painters
American male painters
20th-century American painters
American Impressionist painters
19th-century American male artists
20th-century American male artists